Julie Kent (born 19 April 1965, Hobart) is a retired Australian diver. She represented Australia at the 1984 and 1988 Olympic Games, as well as the 1982 and 1986 Commonwealth Games. She won a bronze medal in the 10m platform in the 1986 Commonwealth Games. World Age Group Champion 1983, winner of Federation of Australian sport Junior athlete of the year 1983. She was an Australian Institute of Sport scholarship holder.

Julie was a selector for diving Australia for a number of years and managed the most successful Olympic Diving team in 2004 at the Athens Olympic Games.

In 1997, Kent became the first woman president of the Tasmanian Olympic Council. In 2007, she was entered onto the Tasmanian Honour Roll of Women. As of 2019, she was unemployed after running a cafe business for seven years.

References

1965 births
Living people
Australian female divers
Commonwealth Games bronze medallists for Australia
Divers at the 1984 Summer Olympics
Divers at the 1988 Summer Olympics
Olympic divers of Australia
Divers at the 1982 Commonwealth Games
Divers at the 1986 Commonwealth Games
Australian Institute of Sport divers
Commonwealth Games medallists in diving
20th-century Australian women
21st-century Australian women
Medallists at the 1986 Commonwealth Games